Qaleh-ye Mirza Soleyman (also Romanized as Qal‘eh-ye Mīrzā Soleymān; also known as Qal‘eh-ye Soleymān Mīrzā) is a village in Kharqan Rural District, Bastam District, Shahrud County, Semnan Province, Iran. At the 2006 census, its population was 415, in 98 families.

References 

Populated places in Shahrud County